The GovLab is an operations research center based at New York University’s Tandon School of Engineering. It was founded by Beth Simone Noveck and Stefaan Verhulst in 2012 with the goal of providing solutions that improve the ability of institutions to work more openly and efficiently through the usage of modern technologies including blockchains. The GovLab is the chair of the MacArthur Foundation Research Network on Opening Governance. In late 2018, GovLab announced the launch of The GovLab Madrid, an urban innovation laboratory created in collaboration with the City Council of Madrid.

Summary of Projects
Much of The GovLab’s work involves using technology to connect governments to expertise outside those governments, including among the citizenry and in the private sector. Some of the GovLab’s areas of focus are: 
 Open Data
 Open government
 Coaching & Mentorship  via The GovLab Academy
The World Bank and GovLab study the impact of open government in collaboration with partners such as Global Integrity, Results for Development Institute and the Open Government Partnership.

More information can be found in the projects section of The GovLab's website.

Media Recognition
Modern Healthcare Magazine described The GovLab's research work with NHS England, describing the outcomes of the work as increasing "the use of data to produce greater accountability within healthcare organizations, enable consumers to make better-informed choices when selecting providers, improve treatment outcomes, increase patient satisfaction and efficiency, and spur innovation and economic growth."

References

External links

TheGovLab Twitter
 Network of Innovators
 Open Data's Impact 
 Open Data 500

American companies established in 2012
Companies based in Brooklyn
2012 establishments in New York City
New York University research institutes